Martine Chevallier (born 1949 in Gap, Hautes-Alpes, France) is a French actress.

Career
Martine Chevallier joined the Conservatoire national supérieur d’art dramatique in the class of Antoine Vitez and won the first prize in 1974.

In 1986, she joined the Comédie-Française and has been a sociétaire since 1988.

Filmography

Theater

References

External links
 

1949 births
Living people
French stage actresses
French film actresses
French television actresses
Best Actress Lumières Award winners